Helicigona rossmaessleri, also known as Chilostoma rossmaessleri or Faustina rossmaessleri, is a species of medium-sized, air-breathing land snail, a terrestrial pulmonate gastropod mollusk in the family Helicidae, the true snails.

Distribution 
This species is found in Poland and Slovakia.

References 

Chilostoma
Gastropods described in 1842
Taxonomy articles created by Polbot
Taxobox binomials not recognized by IUCN